Aşağıkükür is a village in Anamur district of Mersin Province, Turkey. The population of Aşağıkükür is 180  as of 2011. Up until 1970 Aşağıkükür was a part of Kükür

References

Villages in Anamur District